Lukas Windfeder (born 11 May 1995) is a German field hockey player who plays as a defender for Uhlenhorst Mülheim and the Germany national team.

Personal life
Windfeder was born in Mülheim, Germany and plays his club hockey for HTC Uhlenhorst Mülheim. He also has a sister, Katharina, who has represented the German women's national indoor team.

Career

Junior national team
Windfeder has represented the junior national team on multiple occasions, accumulating 23 caps for the team, and also winning two Junior World Cup medals.

Senior national team
Windfeder debuted for the senior national team in 2014, in a test series against South Africa. Since his debut, he has been a regular inclusion in the German team. In 2018, he was named in the German team for the Hockey World Cup in Bhubaneswar, India. On 28 May 2021, he was named in the squad for the 2021 EuroHockey Championship and the 2020 Summer Olympics. He scored two goals in the tournament as they won the silver medal after they lost the final to the Netherlands after a shoot-out.

References

External links

1995 births
Living people
German male field hockey players
Male field hockey defenders
Sportspeople from Mülheim
2018 Men's Hockey World Cup players
HTC Uhlenhorst Mülheim players
Field hockey players at the 2020 Summer Olympics
Olympic field hockey players of Germany
Men's Feldhockey Bundesliga players
2023 Men's FIH Hockey World Cup players
21st-century German people